De Bonte Wever (formerly De Smelt) is a sports arena located in Assen, Netherlands.

De venue opened in the 1970s with a 400-meter speed skating track. Later an ice hockey hall was added. In the early 1990s the city of Assen became the owner of the sports complex. The speed skating track became semi-indoors and a subtropic swimming pool was added. In 2009 De Smelt was bought by Jan Smit, who changed the name to De Bonte Wever. In 2010 a hotel was built near the complex.

Events
1973 ISU Allround World Junior Championships
1975 ISU Women's Allround World Championships
1980 ISU Allround World Junior Championships
1982 ISU Men's Allround World Championships
1984 ISU Allround World Junior Championships
2006-2009 Dutch Open Dance Sport Championships
2007 KNSB Dutch Single Distance Championships

Track records

Speed skating
These are the current track records in Assen.

Icetrack cycling
400 m Ice Track Cycling flying lap World Record (33,18) 2015-12-11

References

Indoor arenas in the Netherlands
Speed skating venues in the Netherlands
Sports venues in Drenthe
Sport in Assen
Buildings and structures in Assen
1970s establishments in the Netherlands
Sports venues completed in the 1970s
20th-century architecture in the Netherlands